20 Squadron or 20th Squadron may refer to:

 No. 20 Squadron RAAF, a unit of the Australian Royal Air Force
 No. 20 Squadron RAF, a unit of the United Kingdom Royal Air Force
 20th Fighter Squadron, a unit of the United States Air Force
 20th Bomb Squadron, a unit of the United States Air Force
 20th Intelligence Squadron, a unit of the United States Air Force
 20th Reconnaissance Squadron (disambiguation), units of the United States Air Force
 20th Special Operations Squadron, a unit of the United States Air Force
 20th Space Control Squadron, a unit of the United States Air Force
 20th Operational Weather Squadron, a unit of the United States Air Force